Nickel(II) carbonate describes one or a mixture of inorganic compounds containing nickel and carbonate. From the industrial perspective, the most important nickel carbonate is basic nickel carbonate with the formula Ni4CO3(OH)6(H2O)4. Simpler carbonates, ones more likely encountered in the laboratory, are NiCO3 and its hexahydrate. All are paramagnetic green solids containing  Ni2+ cations. The basic carbonate is an intermediate in the hydrometallurgical purification of nickel from its ores and is used in electroplating of nickel.

Structure and reactions
NiCO3 adopts a structure like calcite, consisting of nickel in an octahedral coordination geometry.

Nickel carbonates are hydrolyzed upon contact with aqueous acids to give solutions containing the ion [Ni(H2O)6]2+, liberating water and carbon dioxide in the process. Calcining (heating to drive off CO2 and water) of these carbonates gives nickel oxide:
NiCO3 → NiO + CO2

The nature of the resulting oxide depends on the nature of the precursor. The oxide obtained from the basic carbonate is often most useful for catalysis.

Basic nickel carbonate can be made by treating solutions of nickel sulfate with sodium carbonate:
4 Ni2+ + CO32− + 6 OH− + 4 H2O → Ni4CO3(OH)6(H2O)4

The hydrated carbonate has been prepared by electrolytic oxidation of nickel in the presence of carbon dioxide:
Ni + O + CO2 + 6 H2O → NiCO3(H2O)4

Uses
Nickel carbonates are used in some ceramic applications and as precursors to catalysts.

Natural occurrence
The natural nickel carbonate is known as gaspéite - a rare mineral. Basic Ni carbonates also have some natural representatives.

Safety
It is moderately toxic and causes low irritation. Avoid prolonged contact.

References

Carbonates
Nickel compounds
IARC Group 1 carcinogens